The 1964 presidential election in Arkansas was held on November 3, 1964 as part of the 1964 United States presidential election. State voters chose six electors, or representatives to the Electoral College, who voted for president and vice president. Incumbent President Lyndon B. Johnson won the state of Arkansas with 56.06% of the popular vote, which was a substantial increase upon John F. Kennedy's 50.19% from the preceding election, although the Republican vote remained virtually unchanged at 43.41%. Johnson won all but ten of Arkansas' seventy-five counties, and all four congressional districts. , this is the last election in which Arkansas voted for a different candidate than neighboring Louisiana. Furthermore, with Mississippi, Alabama, Georgia, and South Carolina voting for Goldwater, Arkansas became the last Southern state to have never voted for a Republican candidate since Reconstruction.

Background
Given the segregationism of its long-serving governor Orval Faubus, who had gained almost seven percent of the vote in the preceding presidential election, Arkansas would have seemed potentially likely to succumb to Goldwater due to his opposition to the recent Civil Rights Act. However, the GOP's nomination of the moderate Winthrop Rockefeller in the party's first serious run for governor in the state since Reconstruction took the steam out of a Goldwater challenge. Faubus refused to endorse Goldwater, despite hesitating over this during the summer. In addition, many white southerners commented to the effect that

In mid-July, Texas Governor John Connally had made private polls suggesting that Johnson would lose Arkansas, in addition to the Deep South states of Mississippi and Alabama which were leaning heavily towards Goldwater. Nonetheless, that the increase in black registration in the Natural State had exceeded Kennedy's margin in 1960 suggested that Johnson's civil rights legislation did have some potential to help him, and in early August polls suddenly became confident Johnson would carry the state due to Goldwater's policies of privatizing Social Security and expanding the war in Southeast Asia – a policy that did not play well in this isolationist state. By October, a New York Times poll saw Arkansas as "safe" for Johnson and his leads in polls increased as election day came closer.

Ultimately, Johnson comfortably carried Arkansas, becoming the twenty-third and last consecutive Democratic presidential nominee to win the state; however, anti-civil rights sentiment did cause Arkansas to vote 9.92 percentage points more Republican than the nation at-large – this being the first time in 96 years when it had voted less Democratic than the nation.

Johnson doubled Kennedy's margin, and reclaimed the counties of Clay, Craighead, Fulton, Marion, Randolph and Sharp, which in 1960 had defected to the GOP for the first time ever or since Reconstruction as a result of powerful anti-Catholicism. Johnson also claimed thirteen other Ozark counties which had supported Nixon in 1960.

However, in the Delta and south of the state sufficient backlash against black civil rights occurred for Goldwater to claim six counties in those regions from the Democrats. Of these, only state namesake Arkansas County had ever been carried by a Republican since the McKinley era. Ashley County and Drew County voted Republican for the first time since James G. Blaine in 1884, Union County for the first time since Reconstruction, and Columbia and Howard Counties for the first time ever.

Results

Results by county

See also
 United States presidential elections in Arkansas

Notes

References

1964
Arkansas
1964 Arkansas elections